The men's middleweight event was part of the boxing programme at the 1988 Summer Olympics. The weight class allowed boxers of up to 75 kilograms to compete. The competition was held from 19 September to 1 October 1988. 33 boxers from 33 nations competed. Henry Maske won the gold medal.

Anthony Hembrick of the United States never had the opportunity to fight in the 1988 Olympics. Hembrick and his coach, Ken Adams, misinterpreted the fight schedule. Afterwards, they blamed the schedule for being too confusing. By the time Hembrick arrived at Chamshil Students' Gymnasium twelve minutes late, he had been disqualified and the match was being awarded to South Korean Ha Jong-ho.

Medalists

Results
The following boxers took part in the event:

First round
 Sven Ottke (FRG) def. Aharon Jacobashvili (ISR), 5:0
 Michele Mastrodonato (ITA) def. Mirwan Kassouf (LEB), RSC-1

Second round
 Chris Sande (KEN) def. Juan Montiel (URU), KO-3
 Paul Kamela (CMR) def. Georgios Ioannidis (GRE), 3:2
 Kieran Joyce (IRL) def. Filipo Palako Vaka (TNG), RSC-1
 Franco Wanyama (UGA) def. Omar Dabaj (JOR), 5:0
 Sello Mojela (LES) def. Simon Stubblefield (LBR), 5:0
 Henry Maske (GDR) def. Helman Palije (MLW), 5:0
 Ha Jong-Ho (KOR) def. Anthony Hembrick (USA), walk-over
 Lotfi Ayed (SWE) def. John Tobin (GRN), 5:0
 Hussain Shah Syed (PAK) def. Martin Amarillas (MEX), 3:2
 Serge Kabongo (ZAI) def. James Iahuat (VAN), RSC-1
 Zoltán Fuzesy (HUN) def. Ahmed Dine (ALG), 5:0
 Esa Hukkanen (FIN) def. Roberto Martínez (HON), 5:0
 Darko Dukić (YUG) def. Vili Lesiva (SAM), RSC-2
 Egerton Marcus (CAN) def. Emmanuel Legaspi (PHI), KO-1
 Ruslan Taramov (URS) def. Samuel Simbo (SLE), KO-1
 Sven Ottke (FRG) def. Ha Jong-Ho (KOR), 5:0

Third round
 Chris Sande (KEN) def. Paul Kamela (CMR), 5:0
 Franco Wanyama (UGA) def. Kieran Joyce (IRL), 3:2
 Henry Maske (GDR) def. Sello Mojela (LES), walk-over
 Michele Mastrodonato (ITA) def. Lotfi Ayed (SWE), 5:0
 Hussain Shah Syed (PAK) def. Serge Kabongo (ZAI), 5:0
 Zoltán Fuzesy (HUN) def. Esa Hukkanen (FIN), 5:0
 Egerton Marcus (CAN) def. Darko Dukić (YUG), KO-2
 Sven Ottke (FRG) def. Ruslan Taramov (URS), 5:0

Quarterfinals
 Chris Sande (KEN) def. Franco Wanyama (UGA), 5:0
 Henry Maske (GDR) def. Michele Mastrodonato (ITA), 5:0
 Hussain Shah Syed (PAK) def. Zoltán Fuzesy (HUN), 3:2
 Egerton Marcus (CAN) def. Sven Ottke (FRG), 5:0

Semifinals
 Henry Maske (GDR) def. Chris Sande (KEN), 5:0
 Egerton Marcus (CAN) def. Hussain Shah Syed (PAK), 4:1

Final
 Henry Maske (GDR) def. Egerton Marcus (CAN), 5:0

References

Middleweight